Verkhny Aradirikh is a rural locality (a selo) in Aradirikhsky Selsoviet, Gumbetovsky District, Republic of Dagestan, Russia. The population was 494 as of 2010. There are 3 streets.

Geography 
Verkhny Aradirikh is located 52 km southeast of Mekhelta (the district's administrative centre) by road. Sredny Aradirikh and Khindakh are the nearest rural localities.

References 

Rural localities in Gumbetovsky District